Olena Sergeyevna Berkova (Olena Serhiyvna Berkova; born 11 March 1985) is a Ukrainian-Russian former glamour model and pornographic actress, television presenter, singer and actress.

Biography
Olena Berkova was born on March 11, 1985, in Murmansk, Russia. As a child, she moved with her family to Mykolaiv, Ukraine.

In 2004, Berkova came to her sister in Saint Petersburg from Mykolaiv. She worked in a webcam studio. For 56 days she was a participant in the reality show "Dom-2" (arrived on May 12, 2004, left on July 7).

In 2004, Elena joined the popular show Dom-2 on TV channel TNT. In 2006, Elena appeared as a singer in with the pop music girl group Min net!.

At age 24, Berkova gave birth to a son. The child's father is her third ex-husband, Ivan Belkov.

In March 2009, Berkova, announced her intention to participate in the elections of the mayor of Sochi. Her campaign-video appeared on the Internet. Later Berkova refused to participate in the elections.

On 2 November 2017, Berkova announced her candidacy for the 2018 Russian presidential election and even recorded a video with the election program.

Filmography
 2005 –  Bandit Petersburg 7: Redistribution (TV series)
 2015 – Sex Competition 2
 2018 – All or Nothing
– Source:

References

External links

 

1985 births
Living people
21st-century Russian singers
21st-century Russian women singers
People from Murmansk
Russian female adult models
Russian pornographic film actresses
Russian television presenters
Russian women television presenters